Locum Beati Petri  was a papal bull issued by Pope Leo XII on 30 June 1828, reorganizing the ecclesiastical jurisdiction in Dalmatia. 

The bull degraded Archdiocese of Split to the level of the diocese. The Diocese of Makarska was merged with the Diocese of Split creating the Diocese of Split-Makarska. The diocese became subject of the Archdiocese of Zadar which was proclaimed seat of the Dalmatian ecclesiastical province.

The Archdiocese of Dubrovnik was also degraded to the level of the diocese. The Diocese of Poreč was merged with the Diocese of Pula creating Diocese of Poreč-Pula. Eight dioceses were abolished: Diocese of Korčula, Diocese of Ston, Diocese of Novigrad, Diocese of Osor, Diocese of Rab, Diocese of Skradin, Diocese of Nin and Diocese of Trogir.

Notes 

19th-century papal bulls
Documents of Pope Leo XII
Croatia under Habsburg rule
Kingdom of Dalmatia
June 1828 events